John William Getz (born October 15, 1946) is an American character actor. After starting his acting career on stage, he has appeared in numerous television series and films.

Personal life
Getz, one of four children, was born in Davenport, Iowa, and grew up in the Mississippi River Valley. He began acting while attending the University of Iowa, where he helped found the Center for New Performing Arts. 

He has a daughter, Hannah, from his marriage to playwright Grace McKeaney.

Career
Getz dropped out of college to attend the American Conservatory Theater in San Francisco. While working in a winery, he helped found the Theater Company in Napa County, California. His location in the grape-growing Napa Valley led to Getz's television debut in a made-for-television horror film Killer Bees (1974). Killer Bees starred Gloria Swanson, Craig Stevens, Kate Jackson, and Edward Albert. Getz then moved to New York City, where he became active in local theater while doing an 18-month stint as Neil Johnson on the soap opera Another World.

Getz appeared in The Happy Hooker (1975) and followed up with several other roles before starring in the Coen Brothers' neo-noir thriller Blood Simple (1984). He played the doomed lover of a married woman (Frances McDormand) who woefully misinterprets his increasingly complex circumstances.

In 1985, he co-starred in the unsuccessful police drama MacGruder and Loud. The pilot was given the post-Super Bowl time slot, contributing to its strong debut in the ratings. However, ABC rescheduled it repeatedly and finally relegated it to the "graveyard slot", 10:00 p.m. EST, Monday night. 

Getz appeared in two different shows with the name "Maggie" in the title: 1984's Maggie Briggs, where he appeared as newspaper editor Geoff Bennett, and 1998's Maggie as the title character's husband, Dr. Arthur Day.

Getz also appeared in The Fly (1986) and The Fly II (1989) as Stathis Borans, a science magazine editor who pays a heavy price for his curiosity. Also in 1989, he played a Marine Corps Major in Born on the Fourth of July. In 1991, Getz appeared as the unpleasant boyfriend of professional women in Don't Tell Mom the Babysitter's Dead and Curly Sue. In 1990, Getz appeared as a crime boss in the Charlie Sheen and Emilio Estevez spoof Men At Work. In 1994, he appeared in the film Playmaker, starring Colin Firth and Jennifer Rubin.

In 2007, he had a role in David Fincher's film Zodiac. Also in 2007, he appeared in Bill Guttentag and Dan Sturman's documentary film Nanking as George Ashmore Fitch, head of the local YMCA and administrative director of the International Committee for the Nanking Safety Zone. Getz also had a role in Fincher's film The Social Network (2010), about the founding of Facebook. He appeared in the suspense thriller Elevator as a Wall Street executive trapped in an elevator with a group of strangers, one of whom has a bomb. Written and produced by Marc Rosenberg and directed by Stig Svendsen, Elevator was released in July 2012. He appeared in Trumbo (2015) as director Sam Wood.

Through the decades, Getz has guest-starred in many television series, including Barney Miller (in the 1977 episode "Atomic Bomb") and Three's Company (1980), where he played Lee Tripper, brother of Jack Tripper. He has guest-starred in How I Met Your Mother, Prison Break, The King of Queens and Private Practice, and had recurring roles in Homeland (from 2014–2017), Timeless (2016–2018) and Bosch (2017–2018).

Filmography

The Happy Hooker (1975) as Trout Fisherman
The New Adventures of Wonder Woman (1977) as Christian Harrison
Tattoo (1981) as Buddy
Muggable Mary, Street Cop (1982, TV movie) as Dan Waters
Blood Simple (1984) as Ray
Thief of Hearts (1984) as Ray Davis
The Fly (1986) as Stathis Borans
The Fly II (1989) as Stathis Borans
Born on the Fourth of July (1989) as Marine Major - Vietnam
Men at Work (1990) as Maxwell Potterdam III
Don't Tell Mom the Babysitter's Dead (1991) as Gus
Curly Sue (1991) as Walker McCormick
Fortunes of War (1994) as Franklin Hewitt
Playmaker (1994) as Eddie
A Passion to Kill (1994) as Jerry
Mojave Moon (1996) as Police Officer
Painted Hero (1997) as Sheriff Acuff
Some Girl (1998) as Claire's Father
Held for Ransom (2000) as Mr. Kirkland
Zenon: The Zequel (2001, TV Film) as General Hammond
A Day Without a Mexican (2004) as Senator Abercombie
Living 'til the End (2005) as Mr. Hines
The West Wing (2006) as Congressman Mark B. Sellner
Nanking (2007) as George Fitch
Zodiac (2007) as Templeton Peck
Hard Four (2007) as Blazedell Woodruff
Superhero Movie (2008) as Lunatic Editor
A Line in the Sand (2008) as Captain McClenon
Grey's Anatomy (2008) as Michael Breyers
The Social Network (2010) as Sy
NCIS (2010) as Walter Kane
Ghost Whisperer (2010) as Rudy Wharton
Elevator (2011) as Henry Barton
Jobs (2013) as Paul Jobs
Law & Order: SVU (2013) as Admiral Vincent Albers
Desperate Acts of Magic (2013) as Don Tarzia
Halt and Catch Fire (2014) as Joe MacMillan, Sr.
The Perfect Guy (2015) as Renkin
Trumbo (2015) as Sam Wood
Certain Women (2016) as Sheriff Rowles
Transparent (2016-2017) as Donald
Better Call Saul (2017) as Chairman
Bosch (2017) as Bradley Walker
American Horror Story: Apocalypse (2018) as Mr. St. Pierre Vanderbilt
Body at Brighton Rock (2019) as Sheriff
Doom Patrol (2020) as Paul Trainor
The Last of Us (2023) as Edelstein

References

External links
 
TalkMoviesWorld.com
TheaterMania.com
Quad-City Times

1946 births
Male actors from Iowa
University of Iowa alumni
American male film actors
American male stage actors
American male television actors
Living people
Actors from Davenport, Iowa
20th-century American male actors
21st-century American male actors